Syllepte nigrodentalis is a moth in the family Crambidae. It was described by Pagenstecher in 1884. It is found in Indonesia (Ambon Island).

References

Moths described in 1884
nigrodentalis
Moths of Indonesia